13/8 is a live album by Iranian singer-songwriter Mohsen Namjoo.13/8 recorded before a live audience at Berkeley, California on April 28, 2012. The album Released in October 2012.

Track listing
 "Tehran" – 10:27
 "Biyaid" – 9:16
 "Bigah Shod" – 11:27
 "Khat Bekesh" – 13:45
 "Zan Yar" – 13:02
 "13/8" – 7:36
 "Ro Sar Beneh" – 8:15
 "Sanama" – 4:50

Credits
James Riotto: Bass
Robert Shelton: Keyboards
Ezra Lipp: Drums
Siamack Sanaie: Rhythm Guitar
 Mohsen Namjoo: Vocals, Setar, Acoustic Guitar

Online Sources
13/8 on iTunes
13/8 at Amazon

References

External links
 13/8 at Cdbaby

Mohsen Namjoo albums
2012 live albums